Jim Monos is an American former football coach. He served two stints as the head football coach at Lebanon Valley College in Annville, Pennsylvania, from 1986 to 1996 and again from 2004 to 2015, compiling a record of 109–122–2 in 23 seasons. Monos played college football at Virginia Military Institute (VMI) and Shippensburg University. He was an assistant coach at Shippensburg from 1976 to 1985 and as its offensive coordinator from 1997 to 2003.

Monos retired at the end of the 2015 season. He was inducted into the Lebanon Valley College Hall of Fame in 2017. He has also been inducted into the Shippensburg University Athletic Hall of Fame.

Head coaching record

References

Year of birth missing (living people)
Living people
American football quarterbacks
Baseball shortstops
Lebanon Valley Flying Dutchmen football coaches
Shippensburg Red Raiders baseball players
Shippensburg Red Raiders football players
VMI Keydets football players
High school football coaches in Delaware
High school football coaches in Pennsylvania
People from Shippensburg, Pennsylvania
Coaches of American football from Pennsylvania
Players of American football from Pennsylvania
Baseball players from Pennsylvania